Choi Si-won (born 7 April 1986), known mononymously as Siwon, is a South Korean singer, songwriter, model, and actor known for his work as a member of South Korean boy group Super Junior. Choi committed as special representative of UNICEF Korea for children’s issues over the last four years before he was chosen as UNICEF regional ambassador for East Asia and Pacific in November 2019.

Aside from being a member of Super Junior, Choi has also ventured into solo activities, mainly acting. He played lead roles in the Korean dramas Oh! My Lady (2010), Poseidon (2011), Revolutionary Love (2017), and My Fellow Citizens! (2019) and had supporting roles in Athena: Goddess of War (2010), The King of Dramas (2012) and She Was Pretty (2015). Choi has also participated in various Chinese language films such as Helios, To the Fore and Dragon Blade.

Choi Si-won is a representative for Audi Korea. In 2015, Choi Si-won was chosen by the Swiss luxury watchmaker brand Piaget as their youngest Asian model. As in 2016, Choi Si-won is listed in Forbes magazine "30 Under 30 Asia". Si-won is described as "one of South Korea’s most sought-after singers and actors".

Choi Si-won will be producer of an upcoming film. In 2015, Choi Siwon with EnterMedia Pictures (CEO Lee Dong Hoon) purchased the rights to the 2011 Daum webtoon "Interview," authored by Rude Vico (romanized from the Korean 루드비코).

In October 2015, Choi Si-won became the first Korean to reach 5 million Twitter followers.

Early life
Choi was born in Seoul, South Korea, on 10 February 1987. He has one younger sister, Ji-won. His father was the former CEO of Boryung Medicine, a pharmaceutical company.

Career
Choi was scouted by a talent agent from SM Entertainment when he was 16 as he was waiting for friends in front of his high school. The agent recommended him to audition for the company's Starlight Casting System. He auditioned without his parents' approval; his parents were notified only after he passed the auditions. Although his parents allowed him to sign a contract with SM Entertainment, they did not give him any help because they wanted him to take responsibility for his actions.

He later moved into dormitories with fellow trainees and was trained in areas of singing, acting, dancing as well as languages. He was featured in a music video of The Grace's Dana whilst he was being trained as a solo singer in 2003. A year after, Choi made a brief appearance in family drama, Precious Family and again in 2005 in the KBS romance comedy drama Eighteen, Twenty-Nine as young Kang Bong-man, while in 2006 he played the supporting role of Park Sang-woo in romance melodrama Spring Waltz.

Debut with Super Junior and Super Junior-M

Not long after Choi's first television appearance, SM Entertainment released an announcement that he would debut as one of the twelve members in a boy band. A few months before the debut of Super Junior 05, Choi made his first media appearance with bandmate Han Geng as one of the runway models in a fashion show by Bum Suk.

Choi debuted as part of 12-member rotational project group Super Junior 05 on 6 November 2005 on SBS' music program Popular Songs, performing their first single, "Twins (Knock Out)". Their debut album Twins was released a month later on 5 December 2005 and debuted at number three  on the monthly MIAK K-pop album charts.

In March 2006, SM Entertainment began to recruit new members for the next Super Junior generation. However, plans changed and the company declared a halt in forming future Super Junior generations. Following the addition of thirteenth member Kyuhyun, the group dropped the suffix "05" and became officially credited as Super Junior. The re-polished group's first CD single "U" was released on 7 June 2006, which was their most successful single until the release of "Sorry, Sorry" in March 2009, which helped them achieve global success. 

In April 2008, Choi was put into seven-member sub-group Super Junior-M, a Mandopop subgroup of Super Junior for the Chinese music industry. They debuted in China at the 8th Annual Music Chart Awards, simultaneously with the release of their first music video, "U" on 8 April 2008. This was followed by the release of the debut Chinese-language studio album, Me in selected provinces in China on 23 April and 2 May in Taiwan.

Acting career
In 2006, Choi was cast in the Hong Kong epic film A Battle of Wits, playing the role of the Liang Prince. This also marks his film debut. Choi received praise from co-star Andy Lau, who stated that Choi sets a good example for Hong Kong actors.

In 2007, Choi starred in Attack on the Pin-Up Boys along with other Super Junior members.  The same year, he was cast in MBC's two-episode mini series Legend of Hyang Dan.

After a three-year hiatus, Choi returned to the screen with SBS' romantic comedy Oh! My Lady. The same year, he starred in the big-budget spy series Athena: Goddess of War, a spin-off to the 2009 hit drama Iris. He plays a data analyst and rookie elite agent.

In 2011, Choi headlined KBS' action drama Poseidon. The same year, he starred in his first taiwanese drama Skip Beat! with Ivy Chen and fellow band member Donghae. The series is a live-action adaptation of Japanese shōjo manga titled Skip Beat! by Yoshiki Nakamura.

In 2012, Choi starred in SBS' comedy satire drama The King of Dramas, based around Korean television production. He plays Kang Hyun-min, a top celebrity with a prickly personality.

Choi starred in multiple projects in 2015. He co-starred in Hong Kong historical-action film Dragon Blade with Jackie Chan, crime thriller Helios and sports drama To the Fore alongside Eddie Peng and Shawn Dou. He also starred in the Chinese romance drama Fall In Love With You Again and was cast in Billion Dollar Heir, a Chinese adaptation of the 2013 hit drama The Heirs.
Back in Korea, Choi starred as the second male lead in MBC's romantic comedy She Was Pretty. He received critical acclaim for his acting performance and comedic portrayal of the character, and experienced a rise in popularity.  He released a single for the drama titled "Only You", which ranked atop the music charts. 

In October 2017, Choi started in the tvN's youth romance drama Revolutionary Love alongside Kang So-ra. This marked his first project after releasing from his mandatory military enlistment on 18 August 2017.

In April 2019, Choi starred in KBS’s crime comedy drama My Fellow Citizens!.

Personal life
Choi graduated from Apgu Jeong High School in February 2006 and from Inha University in February 2012 alongside fellow member Kim Ryeowook.

Choi is well known as a devout Protestant Christian, and has said in an interview that after his career, he would like to become a missionary. He frequently posts Bible quotes on his Twitter and Weibo accounts. He has also collaborated with the Christian singing group 3rd Wave Music along with other K-pop artists.

In 2008, Choi appeared on Chinese postage stamps, one of the first four South Korean artists to do so. The stamps were sold as a charity event to raise funds for victims of an earthquake which happened in China earlier that year.

Choi enlisted as a conscripted policeman on 19 November 2015. He was discharged from mandatory military service on 18 August 2017.

A wax figure of Choi was unveiled at Madame Tussauds in Hong Kong on 19 November 2015.

On 10 December 2021, Siwon tested positive for COVID-19, and did not attend the 2021 Mnet Asian Music Awards.

Controversies 
On 30 September 2017, an untied French bulldog owned by Choi's family bit their neighbor, 53-year-old businesswoman Kim who ran Hanilkwan, an upscale Korean cuisine restaurant. This resulted in the death of the victim six days after the incident. The cause was identified as sepsis, brought on by the bite. Choi and his father separately wrote letters of apology on their Instagram accounts on 21 October 2017. Although a family member of the deceased told media that the family were not willing to take any legal action, the Choi family received severe backlash from the public for not taking any precautionary measures with their dog.

Philanthropy
Choi has joined many UNICEF campaigns since 2010. He was appointed as the special representative of the South Korea committee for UNICEF on 12 November 2015.

Upon his release from the military, Choi confirmed to volunteer for a UNICEF campaign in Vietnam from 21 to 25 August 2017, alongside fellow labelmate Jaemin of NCT Dream. The campaign is named as "SMile for U" which is a music education programme for children with disabilities conducted in partnership with Choi's agency.

Discography

Singles

Filmography

Film

Television series

Web series

Television shows

Music video

Accolades

Notes

References

External links 

Super Junior-M members
Super Junior members
Japanese-language singers
Mandarin-language singers of South Korea
South Korean male idols
South Korean pop singers
South Korean male singers
Age controversies
South Korean male taekwondo practitioners
South Korean rhythm and blues singers
South Korean male film actors
South Korean male television actors
South Korean male web series actors
South Korean television presenters
South Korean radio presenters
South Korean Protestants
Inha University alumni
Male actors from Seoul
Singers from Seoul
21st-century South Korean singers

1986 births
Living people